Regional Park Indore (officially Atal Bihari Vajpayee Regional Park) is a park located in Indore, Madhya Pradesh. The park was developed and created by Indore Development Authority and was opened in 2003. Park is located on 80 acres of land with 42 acres for lake and other 38 for other attractions. Park is named after former Prime Minister of India Atal Bihari Vajpayee.
There is also a canal, which covers the whole park starting from one point of the pond and ending at the other part. The bridges over canal with the mist fountain make one feel a special type of peace, mentally as well as physically.

There are various exciting paddle boats (pedalos), speedboats (or motorboats/powerboats), and even small cruisers. The ride charges for these boats vary from each other.
The latest attraction to the Regional park is the mini cruiser Malwa Queen that has been added here, and is the first in the state. It has two decks, accommodating around 80 people, and has a restaurant and private party rooms.

Attractions 
 Amphitheatre
 Artists' village
 Bio-diversity garden
 Boating
 Fast food zone
 French gardens
 Jumping jet fountain
 Lake-view Point
 Malwa Queen - Only  mini cruise restaurant in the state with capacity for 80 persons.
 Mist fountain
 Musical Fountain

References

Parks in Indore
Gardens in India
Memorials to Atal Bihari Vajpayee
2003 establishments in Madhya Pradesh